The Lebanese Communication Group is a company set up by the Lebanese Islamist political group Hezbollah, to manage both Al-Manar and Al-Nour networks. The Lebanese Communication Group is sometimes called the Lebanese Media Group.

Hezbollah Secretary General Nasrallah publicized an invitation for all Lebanese citizens to volunteer for Hezbollah military training on al-Manar and al-Nour, who have been the media arms of the Hezbollah network and have facilitated its activities supported by the IRIB and IRGC. Members of Hezbollah's Executive Council, notably Nasrallah, controlled the budgets of al-Manar and al-Nour.

References

Hezbollah
Mass media in Lebanon